The Extraordinary and Plenipotentiary Ambassador of Peru to the Portuguese Republic is the official representative of the Republic of Peru to the Portuguese Republic.

Relations between Peru and what was then the Kingdom of Portugal were established on March 26, 1853 and elevated to embassy level in 1938 with the Portuguese Republic, having been maintained since. In contrast, Spain did not recognize Peru until after the Chincha Islands War, officially establishing relations in 1879.

The first representatives of Peru to "the Old Continent", and José Joaquín de Olmedo, were appointed by Simón Bolívar in 1826. The first representative of Portugal, António José Alves Júnior, arrived in Lima and presented his credentials on November 15, 1945.

List of representatives

See also 

 List of ambassadors of Peru to Spain
 List of ambassadors of Peru to Brazil

Notes

References 

Portugal
Peru